The 2023 Judo Grand Prix Linz will be held at the TipsArena in Linz, Austria from 25 to 27 May 2023 as part of the IJF World Tour and during the 2024 Summer Olympics qualification period.

References

External links
 

2023 Judo Grand Prix
2023 IJF World Tour
Judo
Grand Prix 2023
Judo
Judo
Judo Grand Prix Linz